The 1959 Norwegian Football Cup was the 54th season of the Norwegian annual knockout football tournament. The tournament was open for all members of NFF, except those from Northern Norway. Skeid was the defending champions, but was eliminated by the second-tier team Nessegutten in the fourth round.

The final was played at Ullevaal Stadion in Oslo on 25 October 1959, and was contested by Viking, which had won the cup once in 1953, and Sandefjord BK who played their second cup final, having lost the final in 1957. Viking won 2-1 after extra time against Sandefjord in the final, and secured their second title.

First round

|-
|colspan="3" style="background-color:#97DEFF"|Replay

|}

Second round

|-
|colspan="3" style="background-color:#97DEFF"|Replay

|}

Third round

|colspan="3" style="background-color:#97DEFF"|9 August 1959

 

|-
|colspan="3" style="background-color:#97DEFF"|Replay: 12 August 1959

|}

Fourth round

|colspan="3" style="background-color:#97DEFF"|30 August 1959

 

|-
|colspan="3" style="background-color:#97DEFF"|Replay: 2 September 1959

|}

Quarter-finals

|colspan="3" style="background-color:#97DEFF"|20 September 1959

 
 

|-
|colspan="3" style="background-color:#97DEFF"|Replay: 27 September 1959

|}

Semi-finals

|colspan="3" style="background-color:#97DEFF"|4 October 1959

|}

Final

See also
1958–59 Norwegian Main League
1959 in Norwegian football

References

Norwegian Football Cup seasons
Norway
Cup